Robert Hungerford, 3rd Baron Hungerford (c.1429 – 17 May 1464) was an English nobleman. He supported the Lancastrian cause in the War of the Roses. In the late 1440s and early 1450s he was a member of successive parliaments. He was a prisoner of the French for much of the 1450s until his mother arranged a payment of a 7,966l ransom. In 1461, after defeat on the Towton battlefield on 29 March, he fled with Henry VI to Scotland. In 1461 he was attainted in Edward IV's first parliament, and executed in Newcastle soon after he was captured at the Battle of Hexham.

Origins
He was the son and heir of Robert Hungerford, 2nd Baron Hungerford (son of Walter Hungerford, 1st Baron Hungerford (died 1449)) by his wife Margaret, 4th Baroness Botreaux.

Career
Following his marriage to the heiress Eleanor de Moleyns, he was summoned to Parliament as Baron Moleyns in 1445, and received a like summons until 1453.

Dispute with John Paston
In 1448 Hungerford began a fierce quarrel with John Paston regarding the ownership of the manor of Gresham in Norfolk. Hungerford, acting on the advice of John Heydon, a solicitor of Baconsthorpe, took forcible possession of the estate on 17 February 1448. William Waynflete, bishop of Winchester, made a vain attempt at arbitration. Paston obtained repossession, but on 28 January 1450 Hungerford sent a thousand men to dislodge him. After threatening to kill Paston, who was absent, Hungerford's adherents violently assaulted Paston's wife Margaret, but Hungerford finally had to surrender the manor to Paston.

French wars
In 1452 Hungerford accompanied John Talbot, 2nd Earl of Shrewsbury, to Aquitaine, and was taken prisoner while endeavouring to raise the siege of Chastillon. His ransom was fixed at 7,966l., and his mother sold her plate and mortgaged her estates to raise the money. His release was effected in 1459, after seven years and four months' imprisonment. In consideration of his misfortunes he was granted, in the year of his return to England, licence to export fifteen hundred sacks of wool to foreign ports without paying duty, and received permission to travel abroad. He thereupon visited Florence.

Wars of the Roses
In 1460 Hungerford was home again, and took a leading part on the Lancastrian side in the Wars of the Roses. In June 1460 he retired with Lord Scales and other of his friends to the Tower of London, on the entry of the Earl of Warwick and his Kentish followers into the city; but after the defeat of the Lancastrians at the battle of Northampton (10 July 1460), Hungerford and his friends surrendered the Tower to the Yorkists on the condition that he and Lord Scales should depart free,

After taking part in the Battle of Towton (29 March 1461)—a further defeat for the Lancastrians—Hungerford fled with Henry VI to York, and thence into Scotland. He visited France in the summer to obtain help for Henry and Margaret, and was arrested by the French authorities in August 1461. Writing to Margaret at the time from  Dieppe, he begged her not to lose heart. He was attainted in Edward IV's first parliament in November 1461. He afterward met with some success in his efforts to rally the Lancastrians in the north of England, but was taken prisoner at the Battle of Hexham on 15 May 1464, and was executed at Newcastle.

Marriage and issue
In about 1441, still at a very early age, he married Eleanor de Moleyns (1426-1476), daughter and heiress of William de Moleyns (1406-1429), killed at the Siege of Orleans, son and heir of Sir William de Moleyns (d.1424) of Stoke Poges in Buckinghamshire. Eleanor survived her husband and subsequently married Sir Oliver Manningham. She was buried at Stoke Poges in 1476. By his wife he had issue including: 
 Sir Thomas Hungerford of Rowden
 Sir Walter Hungerford of Farleigh

Death and succession
He was taken prisoner at the Battle of Hexham on 15 May 1464, taken to Newcastle, where he was executed on 17 May.  He was buried in Salisbury Cathedral. On 5 August 1462 many of his lands were granted to Richard, Duke of Gloucester (afterward Richard III). Other portions of his property were given to John Wenlock, 1st Baron Wenlock, who was directed by Edward IV to make provision for Hungerford's wife and young children.

Notes

References
 
 
 Endnotes
Dugdale's Baronage ;
Hoare's Hungerfordiana ;
Letters, &c., of Henry VIII;
Materials for the Keign of Henry VII (Eolls Ser.) ;
Paston Letters, passim, ed. G-airdner;
Hoare's Mod. "Wiltshire, Heytesbury Hundred
Collinson's Somerset, iii. 355.

15th-century births
1464 deaths
15th-century English people
Executed English people
Robert
People executed under the Yorkists
People of the Wars of the Roses
Barons Hungerford